The 2004 Formula 3 Euro Series season was the second championship year of Europe's premier Formula Three series. The championship consisted of ten rounds – each with two races – held at a variety of European circuits. Each weekend consisted of 1 hour and 30 minutes of free practice on Friday – in either one or two sessions – and two 30-minute qualifying sessions. This was followed by a c.110 km race on Saturday and a c.80 km race on Sunday. Each qualifying session awarded one bonus point for pole position and each race awarded points for the top eight finishers, with ten points per win.

Teams and drivers

Driver changes
 Changed Teams
 Jamie Green: Kolles → ASM Formule 3
 Robert Kubica: Prema Powerteam → Mücke Motorsport
 Alexandros Margaritis: MB Racing Performance → AB Racing Performance
 Daniel la Rosa: MB Racing Performance → HBR Motorsport
 Bruno Spengler: ASM F3 → Mücke Motorsport
 Charles Zwolsman Jr.: Kolles → Manor Motorsport

 Entering Formula 3 Euro Series
 Marco Bonanomi: Italian Formula Three Championship (Coloni F3) → Team Ghinzani
 Ruben Carrapatoso: Formula Renault 2000 Italia (Alan Racing) → Opel Team KMS
 Loïc Duval: Championnat de France Formula Renault 2.0 (Graff Racing) → OPEL Team Signature
 Peter Elkmann: International Superkart Series – Division 1 → Swiss Racing Team
 Gregory Franchi: Italian Formula Three Championship (Lucidi Motors) → Opel Team Signature
 Dennis Furchheim: Formula Renault 2000 Germany (Franken Racing) & Spanish Formula Three Championship (Racing Engineering) → Swiss Racing Team
 Giedo van der Garde: Formula Renault 2000 Netherlands & Formula Renault 2000 Masters (van Amersfoort Racing) → Opel Team Signature-Plus
 Maximilian Götz: Formula BMW ADAC (ADAC Berlin-Brandenburg e.V) → TME
 Lewis Hamilton: Formula Renault 2.0 UK (Manor Motorsport) → Manor Motorsport
 Derek Hayes: NASCAR Busch Series (Moy Racing) → Team Ghinzani
 Kohei Hirate: Formula Renault 2000 Italia & Formula Renault 2000 Masters (Prema Powerteam) → Prema Powerteam
 Robert Kath: Formula BMW ADAC (ADAC Sachsen e.V.) → Opel Team KMS
 Tom Kimber-Smith: Formula Ford Great Britain (Panasonic Batteries Racing Team) → Team Kolles
 Christian Montanari: Italian Formula Three Championship (Coloni F3) → Coloni Motorsport
 Hannes Neuhauser: German Formula Three Championship (Achleitner Motorsport) → HBR Motorsport
 Alejandro Núñez: Spanish Formula Three Championship (E.V. Racing & Azteca Motorsport) → Swiss Racing Team
 Franck Perera: Formula Renault 2000 Italia & Formula Renault 2000 Masters (Prema Powerteam) → Prema Powerteam
 Fernando Rees: Formula Three Sudamericana (Cesario F3) → Swiss Racing Team
 Eric Salignon: British Formula 3 Championship (Hitech Racing) → ASM Formule 3
 Roberto Streit: Formula Renault 2000 Italia & Formula Renault 2000 Masters (Prema Powerteam) → Prema Powerteam
 Adrian Sutil: Formula BMW ADAC (HBR Motorsport) → Team Kolles
 Toni Vilander: Formula Renault 2000 Italia & Formula Renault 2000 Masters (RP Motorsport) → Coloni Motorsport
 Ross Zwolsman: Formula Renault 2000 Germany & Formula Renault 2000 Masters (Ma-Con) → TME

 Leaving Formula 3 Euro Series
 Simon Abadie: LD Autosport → World Series Light (Epsilon by Graff)
 Nicolas Armindo: Saulnier Racing → Porsche Carrera Cup Germany (Land Motorsport-PZ Koblenz)
 Bernhard Auinger: Superfund TME → Superfund Euro Formula 3000 (Euronova Racing)
 Ryan Briscoe: Prema Powerteam → Formula One (Panasonic Toyota Racing test driver)
 César Campaniço: Signature Plus → Formula Renault V6 Eurocup (Cram Competition)
 Fabio Carbone: Signature Plus → All-Japan Formula Three Championship (Three Bond Racing)
 Adam Carroll: Opel Team KMS → British Formula 3 Championship (P1 Racing)
 Robert Doornbos: Team Ghinzani → International Formula 3000 (Arden International)
 Maro Engel: Opel Team KMS → German Formula Three Championship (SMS Seyffarth Motorsport)
 Timo Glock: Opel Team KMS  → Formula One (Jordan Ford)
 Lucas di Grassi: Prema Powerteam → British Formula 3 Championship (Hitech Racing)
 Jan Heylen: Kolles → German Formula Three Championship (JB Motorsport) & International Formula 3000 (Team Astromega)
 Christian Klien: ADAC Berlin-Brandenburg →  Formula One (Jaguar Racing)
 Marcel Lasée: Swiss Racing Team → SEAT Leon Supercopa Germany (???)
 Dong-Wook Lee: Drumel Motorsport → Retirement
 Richard Lietz: HBR Motorsport → Porsche Carrera Cup Germany (tolimit Motorsport)
 James Manderson: Swiss Racing Team → Aussie Racing Cars Super Series
 Álvaro Parente: Team Ghinzani → British Formula 3 Championship (Carlin Motorsport)
 Olivier Pla: ASM F3 → World Series by Nissan (RC Motorsport & Carlin Motorsport)
 Harold Primat: Equipe Serge Saulnier → World Series Light (Saulnier Racing)
 Stefano Proetto: Swiss Racing Team → Formula Renault V6 Eurocup (EuroInternational)
 Gilles Tinguely: Swiss Racing Team → Retirement
 Claudio Torre: HBR Motorsport → Retirement
 Hendrick Vieth: Opel Team KMS → Porsche Carrera Cup Germany (Land Motorsport-PZ Koblenz)
 Markus Winkelhock: ADAC Berlin-Brandenburg → German Formula Three Championship (Persson Motorsport)
 Sakon Yamamoto: Superfund TME → All-Japan Formula Three Championship (TOM's)

Midseason changes
 ASM driver Eric Salignon missed the last two rounds at Brno and Hockenheim, but was not immediately replaced. Adrian Sutil left Team Kolles to take over Salignon's #27 car at Hockenheim, and his Kolles seat was taken by Maximilian Götz.
 At Team KMS, Alexandros Margaritis was replaced by Brazilian Ruben Carrapataso from the Nürburgring onwards. Margaritis returned to the series with a new entry from the German F3 Cup (and former Eurseries) team, AB Racing Performance.
 At Swiss Racing Team, Dennis Furchheim was replaced by Alejandro Núñez, after missing rounds 3 and 5 and failing to qualify at Pau (round 4). His team-mate, Fernando Rees, missed rounds 3 and 4 and the #20 car was later driven by Peter Elkmann.
 Part-time appearances included Britain's Derek Hayes in a third Team Ghinzani entry at Brno
 TME's Ross Zwolsman failed to make any further appearances after the first round
 The Coloni Motorsport drivers returned to the Italian Formula Three Championship after the first two rounds
 Japan's Kohei Hirate made his Euro Series debut in a fourth Prema Powerteam entry at Zandvoort and Hockenheim.

Calendar

Results

Season standings

Drivers' standings
Points are awarded as follows:

† — Drivers did not finish the race, but were classified as they completed over 90% of the race distance.

1 Note: Eric Salignon's pole position for race 1 at Pau was initially withdrawn due to a 10-place grid penalty for an engine change after an accident in race 1. Salignon's team successfully claimed force majeure and the pole was reinstated, but the bonus point was not awarded.

Rookie Cup
Rookie drivers are only eligible for the Rookie Cup title if they have not previously competed in a national or international Formula 3 championship.

Nations Cup

See also
2004 Masters of Formula 3

Notes

References

External links
Forix.autosport.com
Speedsport Magazine
Formel3guide.com (German language)
F1Prospects.com

Formula 3 Euro Series seasons
Formula 3 Euro Series
Euro Series
Formula 3 Euro Series